Aasphota is 1988 Indian Kannada political drama film directed by T. S. Nagabharana, based on the novel Ayana by Manu (P. N. Rangan). The film stars Sridhar and H. G. Dattatreya, in his film debut, in the lead roles.

The film won numerous awards including the Best Film both in Filmfare Awards South and Karnataka State Film Awards and for the story, screenplay and Supporting acting.

Cast
 Sridhar
 H. G. Dattatreya
 Triveni
 Sudha Narasimharaju
 Kasaragodu Chinna
 Ashok Badaradinni
 Rajkumar
 Manu
 G. V. Shivanand
 Vishwanatha Rao
 Shankar Rao
 Susheelamma

Soundtrack

The music of the film was composed by C. Ashwath.

Awards and honors
Karnataka State Film Awards - 1987-88
 Best Film
 Best Supporting Actor - H. G. Dattatreya
 Best Story - Manu
 Best Screenplay - T. S. Nagabharana

 1988 : Filmfare Awards South
 Filmfare Award for Best Film - Kannada

References

External links
 

1988 films
1980s Kannada-language films
Indian political films
Films based on Indian novels
Films scored by C. Ashwath
Films directed by T. S. Nagabharana